Wall washer, Anchor plate on walls of buildings
 Wallwasher, a lighting device to illuminate a wall